Alexander Karatheodori Pasha (1833–1906) was an Ottoman Greek statesman and diplomat. He was involved in diplomatic affairs following the aftermath of the Russo-Turkish War of 1877–78.

Biography 

Born in Constantinople (now Istanbul) as a child of a leading Phanariote family. His father, Stefanos Karatheodori, was the personal physician of Sultan Mahmud II. After law studies in Paris, like many Phanariotes he pursued a career in the civil service of the Ottoman Empire. In 1874 he was appointed ambassador to Rome, and in 1878 he took part in the preliminary negotiations with Russia over the Treaty of San Stefano. Several months later was sent to Germany as the head commissioner of the Porte to the Congress of Berlin. There he was successful in changing the San Stefano peace terms in favour of the Ottoman Empire (Treaty of Berlin).

In November 1878, he was appointed Governor-General of Crete with the task of calming the island's tense situation, which had descended into near-civil war due to tensions between the Christian and Muslim inhabitants of the island. Soon however, in December 1878, he was recalled and became Ottoman Minister of Foreign Affairs, a post he held until he resigned from it in 1879.

Karatheodori finished his career as the Porte-appointed Prince of the autonomous Greek island of Samos for a full decade (1885-1895). In May 1895 he was again appointed Governor of Crete amidst renewed inter-communal tension, but was unsuccessful in restoring order and resigned in December.

He died in Constantinople. Another member of his family—his brother Konstantinos Karatheodoris (1841–1922)—later succeeded him for a brief princely rule in Samos in 1906.

Karatheodori translated a mathematical treatise by Nasir al-Din al-Tusi. His great-nephew was the mathematician Constantin Carathéodory.

References

1833 births
1906 deaths
Politicians from Istanbul
Government ministers of the Ottoman Empire
Civil servants from the Ottoman Empire
Politicians of the Ottoman Empire
Pashas
Phanariotes
Princes of Samos
Ambassadors of the Ottoman Empire to Italy
Ottoman governors of Crete
19th-century diplomats
19th-century people from the Ottoman Empire
19th-century rulers in Europe